Modlin railway station is a railway station serving the town of Modlin, in the Masovian Voivodeship, Poland. The station opened in 1877 and is located on the Warsaw–Gdańsk railway. The train services are operated by PKP and Koleje Mazowieckie.

The station building features a ticket office and a Bed & Breakfast hotel.

During Congress Poland (Russian occupation) era, the station was known as Nowogeorgiewsk.

Modernisation
The station was rebuilt between 2010 and 2011 as part of the modernisation of the Warsaw-Gdansk railway.

Train services
The station is served by the following services:

Intercity services Gdynia - Gdansk - Malbork - Warsaw - Katowice - Krakow
Intercity services Olsztyn - Warsaw - Katowice - Krakow
Regional services Dzialdowo - Mlawa - Ciechanow - Nasielsk - Modlin - Nowy Dwor Mazowiecki - Legionowo - Warsaw Gdanska - Warsaw West
Regional services Sierpc - Plonsk - Nasielsk - Modlin - Nowy Dwor Mazowiecki - Legionowo - Warsaw Gdanska
Regional services Modlin - Nowy Dwor Mazowiecki - Legionowo - Warsaw - Warsaw Chopin Airport

Bus services

A shuttle bus service operates to Warsaw Modlin Airport from the station every 20 minutes.

References

Station article at kolej.one.pl
 This article is based upon a translation of the Polish language version as of September 2016.

External links

Railway stations in Poland opened in 1877
Railway stations in Masovian Voivodeship
Nowy Dwór Mazowiecki County
Railway stations in the Russian Empire opened in 1877